Syracosphaerales is an order of algae consisting of three families:

 Calciosoleniaceae 
 Rhabdosphaeraceae 
 Syracosphaeraceae

References

Haptophyte orders